The Jin–Later Liang War, or simply the Jin–Liang War, was a prolonged war fought in northern and central China between 884 and 923 during the late Tang dynasty and the early Five Dynasties period. The initial belligerents were the warlords Li Keyong and Zhu Wen (then known as Zhu Quanzhong), who went on to found the Former Jin dynasty and Later Liang dynasty respectively. After their deaths, their sons Li Cunxu and Zhu Youzhen continued the hostility, which also involved other quick-to-change-allegiance warlords mainly in modern Hebei. The war ended with the conquest of Zhu Youzhen's Later Liang dynasty by Li Cunxu's Later Tang dynasty in 923, after four decades of bloodshed that left much of the fertile Central Plain region destitute.

880s conflicts
890s conflicts
900s conflicts
910s conflicts
920s conflicts
Wars involving the Tang dynasty
Wars of the Five Dynasties and Ten Kingdoms